The term liberal hawk refers to a politically liberal person (generally, in the American sense of the term) who supports a hawkish, interventionist foreign policy.

Overview
Past U.S. presidents Franklin D. Roosevelt, Harry S. Truman, John F. Kennedy and Lyndon B. Johnson have been described as liberal hawks for their roles in bringing about America's status as the world's premier military power. The Clinton Doctrine can also be considered as consistent with this vision. Today the term is most frequently used to describe liberals and leftists who supported or still support the decision to invade Iraq in 2003, which was authorized by the United States Congress and ordered by president George W. Bush. The war has stirred heated controversy among all political sides of the debate. The American left was divided over the issue of whether going to war in Iraq was the right decision, as some liberals felt that they should support the war, in accordance with their philosophy of liberal internationalism, which had caused them to support military intervention earlier.

One document often cited as promoting a liberal hawkish point of view is Progressive Internationalism: A Democratic National Security Strategy, published by the Progressive Policy Institute in October 2003. Another document related to the philosophy is a letter to President Bush sent by Social Democrats USA in February 2003, which urged the military overthrow of Saddam Hussein's regime.

In January 2004, Paul Berman, Thomas Friedman, Christopher Hitchens, George Packer, Kenneth Pollack, Jacob Weisberg, Fareed Zakaria, and Fred Kaplan participated in a five-day online forum, Liberal Hawks Reconsider the Iraq War, in which they discussed whether they had been correct in advocating military action against Saddam Hussein's regime. Kaplan by that point had renounced his prior support, but the general consensus among the participants was that, despite the absence of weapons of mass destruction in Iraq, the war had still been justified on humanitarian grounds.

In his book The Good Fight, published in 2006, Peter Beinart renounced his prior support for the Iraq War: "I was too quick to give up on containment, too quick to think time was on Saddam's side."

Notable people associated

The list includes people who have been described as liberal hawks.

Politicians
 Howard Berman – former U.S. Representative from California
 Joe Biden - U.S. President, elected in 2020
 Tony Blair – former Prime Minister of the United Kingdom
 Ben Cardin – U.S. Senator from Maryland, former U.S. Representative from Maryland
 Hillary Clinton – former First Lady of the United States, former U.S. Senator from New York, former US Secretary of State, 2008 Democratic presidential candidate, 2016 Democratic presidential nominee
 Joe Donnelly – former U.S. Representative and senator from Indiana
 Jane Harman – former U.S. Representative from California
 Michael Ignatieff – former leader of the Liberal Party of Canada, former professor at Harvard's Carr Center for Human Rights Policy
 Henry "Scoop" Jackson – United States Senator who represented Washington State from 1953 to 1983
 Joe Lieberman – former U.S. Senator from Connecticut, 2000 Democratic vice presidential nominee, 2004 Democratic presidential candidate
 Tzipi Livni – former vice prime minister of Israel, founder of the Hatnuah party, Foreign Minister, Justice Minister and Leader of the Opposition.
 Bob Menendez – U.S. Senator from New Jersey, former U.S. Representative from New Jersey
 Kyrsten Sinema – U.S. Senator from Arizona, former U.S. Representative from Arizona

Government officials
 Madeleine Albright (deceased) – former U.S. Ambassador to the United Nations, former U.S. Secretary of State
 Zbigniew Brzezinski (deceased) – former National Security Advisor, political scientist
 Kenneth Pollack – former Clinton administration advisor and senior fellow at The Brookings Institution

Other
Ronald D. Asmus (deceased) – scholar at the German Marshall Fund of the United States
 Paul Berman – contributing editor to Dissent and The New Republic (described as a 'Philosopher King' of liberal hawks)
 Jonathan Chait – self-described liberal hawk
 Larry Diamond – senior fellow at the Hoover Institution
 Christopher Hitchens (deceased) – British-American journalist, essayist, critic and writer
 Michael Tomasky – Editor of Guardian America

See also
 Cold War liberal
 Pro-war Left
 Neoconservatism

References

External links
Progressive Internationalism: A Democratic National Security Strategy
Slate: Liberal Hawks Reconsider the Iraq War
Bush’s Useful Idiots, Tony Judt, London Review of Books, 21 September 2006

Liberalism in the United States
People associated with war
Political terminology of the United States
Metaphors referring to birds